Ned Kelly (1854–1880) was an Australian bushranger, outlaw, gang leader and convicted police murderer.

Ned Kelly may also refer to:
Ned Kelly (1970 film), a film starring Mick Jagger and directed by Tony Richardson
Ned Kelly (2003 film), a film starring Heath Ledger and directed by Gregor Jordan
Ned Kelly (musical), a 1977 Australian musical by Reg Livermore and Patrick Flynn
Ned Kelly (soundtrack), soundtrack album to the 1970 film
Ned Kelly - Music From The Motion Picture, soundtrack album to the 2003 film
Ned Kelly (1946–47), a series of 27 paintings by Sidney Nolan of the bushranger's exploits at the National Gallery of Australia
David Kelly (association footballer) (born 1965), English footballer also known as 'Ned'
Grevillea 'Mason's Hybrid', a grevillea cultivar marketed under the name 'Ned Kelly'
"Ned Kelly", song by Johnny Cash, from Man in Black
"Ned Kelly", song by Waylon Jennings from the 1970 film soundtrack
"Ballad of Ned Kelly" by Trevor Lucas
Ned Kelly (play), a 1942 radio play by Douglas Stewart
"Ned Kelly", a cultivar of the flowering shrub Grevillea banksii

See also
Cultural depictions of Ned Kelly
The Last Outlaw - a 1980 tv mini-series 
True History of the Kelly Gang - a 2017 movie adaptation